The 1961 Grand Prix motorcycle racing season was the 13th F.I.M. Road Racing World Championship Grand Prix season. The season consisted of eleven Grand Prix races in five classes: 500cc, 350cc, 250cc, 125cc and Sidecars 500cc. It began on 23 April, with Spanish Grand Prix and ended with Argentine Grand Prix on 15 October.

1961 Grand Prix season calendar

Standings

Scoring system
Points were awarded to the top six finishers in each race. Only the best of six races were counted in 125cc, 250cc, 350cc and 500cc championships, while in the Sidecars, the best of four were counted.

500cc final standings

350cc Standings

250cc Standings

125cc Standings

References
 Büla, Maurice & Schertenleib, Jean-Claude (2001). Continental Circus 1949-2000. Chronosports S.A. 

Grand Prix motorcycle racing seasons
Grand Prix motorcycle racing season